Gerasa is a village in the Limassol District of Cyprus, located 5 km north of Paramytha.

References

Communities in Limassol District